The Woodwardian Professor of Geology is a professorship held in the Department of Earth Sciences at the University of Cambridge. It was founded by John Woodward in 1728 under the title of Professor of Fossils. Woodward's will left to the University a large collection of fossils and also dictated that the professor should be elected by the Archbishop of Canterbury, the Bishop of Ely, the President of the Royal Society, the President of the Royal College of Physicians, the Member of Parliament for the University of Cambridge, and the University Senate.

Incumbents of the Woodwardian Professorship of Geology
Conyers Middleton, 1731
Charles Mason, 1734 (died 1770 and described on his tomb in Orwell church as "Woodwardian Professor of Fossils")
John Michell, 1762
Samuel Ogden, 1764
Thomas Green, 1778
John Hailstone, 1788
Adam Sedgwick, 1818
Thomas McKenny Hughes, 1873
John Edward Marr, 1917
Owen Thomas Jones, 1930
William Bernard Robinson King, 1943
Oliver Meredith Boone Bulman, 1955
Harry Blackmore Whittington, 1966-1983
Ian Nicholas McCave, 1985-2008
David A. Hodell, 2008-

See also 
List of Professorships at the University of Cambridge

References

 
Geology, Woodwardian
Department of Earth Sciences, University of Cambridge
1728 establishments in England
Geology, Woodwardian